Yeongjong of Goryeo (August 1223 – October ?) was a temporary king of the Korean Goryeo dynasty. He was the second son of King Gojong and the only full younger brother of King Wonjong. He was known before as Marquess Angyeong and Duke Angyeong. Many Korean historians never fully recognize him as a King and his reign period is regarded as his brother's reign.

In 1253, 1259, 1265 and 1266, he visited the Yuan dynasty as an envoy when Goryeo dispatched a negotiating envoy. In 1269, he ascended the throne but dictator Im Yeon was deposed in favor of him. Not until a year, he was deposed under Yuan's pressure. King Gongyang tried to made a burial at his grave, but canceled due to the opposition from his ministers.

Family 
Father: Gojong of Goryeo (고려 고종)
Grandfather: Myeongjong of Goryeo (고려 명종)
Grandmother: Queen Uijeong of the Gim clan (의정왕후 김씨)
Mother: Queen Anhye of the Yu clan (안혜왕후 유씨; d. 1232)
Grandfather: Huijong of Goryeo (고려 희종)
Grandmother:  Queen Seongpyeong of the Jangheung Im clan (성평왕후 임씨; d. 1247)
Consorts and their Respective issue(s):
Deposed Queen Gwon, of the Andong Gwon clan (폐비 권씨), daughter of Gwon Taek (권탁)
Wang Hyeon, Marquess Hanyang (한양후 왕현)
Wang Cheong, Prince Ikyang (익양군 왕청 ) (March 1248 – March 1344)

References

 

1223 births
13th-century Korean monarchs
Anti-kings
Korean Buddhist monarchs
People from Kaesong